Aristote Lusinga (born 20 February 1990) is a French professional  footballer who plays for French club Nantes B. He primarily plays as a centre back, but can also be utilized as a full back.

Club career
Lusinga was born in the commune of Dervallières, a suburb of Nantes. He joined his hometown club FC Nantes in 1998. During his time in the youth system, he excelled and earned caps with France's under-15 side and the under-16 side making his debut in the Tournio de Montaigu. On 28 May 2008, he signed his first professional contract with, agreeing to a three-year deal with Nantes.

In June 2018, he returned to Nantes to helps the youngs in the reserve team.

Controversy
On 17 May 2008, Lusinga was involved in an incident on the final day of the 2007–08 CFA season, while playing with the FC Nantes Reserves, against US Orléans. After receiving a yellow card, from referee Stéphane Jochem, in the 42nd minute, Lusinga would later be cautioned again, prompting a send off. After having words, a very irritated Lusinga headbutted Jochem. Following the match, Lusinga apologized and later sent an apology to the French Football Federation. Despite the remorse, the FFF suspended him from football for a period of two years, with one year being suspended. He was still allowed to train with the club.

Lusinga made his return a year later on 23 May 2009 in a CFA 2 match against US Avranches. He made his league debut a week later on the final match day of the season against Auxerre appearing as a substitute in the 89th minute. Nantes won the match 2–1, but still suffered relegation back to Ligue 2.

Personal life
Lusinga is of Angolan descent.

References

External links
 
 
 

1990 births
Living people
French people of Angolan descent
Footballers from Nantes
French footballers
Association football defenders
FC Nantes players
Vendée Fontenay Foot players
Vendée Poiré-sur-Vie Football players
AS Vitré players
US Avranches players
Championnat National 3 players
Championnat National 2 players
Championnat National players
Ligue 2 players
Ligue 1 players
France youth international footballers